The 2026 elections in India are expected to include the elections of the Rajya Sabha and 4 states and 1 union territory legislative assemblies.

Legislative assembly elections
Sources:

References 

 
Elections in India by year